The Freedom Force is a 1978 animated television series produced by Filmation and aired on CBS as a segment of Tarzan and the Super 7. It showcased a superhero team gathered by the heroine Isis from around the world to help fight evil. Isis had previously appeared in the live-action television series, The Secrets of Isis, although the actress who portrayed her, Joanna Cameron, did not reprise the role for the cartoon.

Only five episodes of the series were produced.

Team members
Merlin
Sinbad
Super Samurai - alter ego of Toshi, a young Japanese boy.
Isis
Hercules - alumnus from the Space Sentinels

Voice cast
 Michael Bell - Merlin; Toshi / Super Samurai; Sinbad
 Diane Pershing - Isis
 Bob Denison - Hercules

Episodes
 The Dragon Riders (written by Don Heckman) - The Freedom Force must end a war between two tribes who dogfight in the air.
 The Scarlet Samurai (written by Gerry Boudreau) - Toshi's new friend is jealous of his powers, and an evil wizard plans to exploit this for revenge against the boy's father, a wizard who defeated the evil wizard long ago.
 The Plant Soldiers (written by Tom Swale) - An evil wizard steals the Necklace of Osiris using it to control the Nile and a magical army of walking plant soldiers.
 Pegasus' Odyssey (written by Gerry Boudreau) - Pegasus is captured by an evil sorceress out to seek revenge on Hercules.
 The Robot (written by Buzz Dixon) - An inventor's mechanical giant is out to prove itself more powerful than the Freedom Force.

Home media
BCI Eclipse LLC (under its Ink & Paint classic animation entertainment brand) (under license from Entertainment Rights) released all 5 episodes of The Freedom Force on DVD in Region 1 on August 22, 2006, along with all 13 episodes of Space Sentinels, presented uncut, digitally remastered for optimum audio and video quality, and in story continuity order, an earlier series that featured several of the same characters.  The digitally-remastered presentation features scripts and Spanish language tracks for all 5 episodes, a gallery featuring original images, early presentation images, trivia and interviews with creators Lou Scheimer, Buzz Dixon, Darrell McNeil, Michael Reaves, Robert Kline and David Wise, as well as numerous special features related to Space Sentinels and Filmation in general.

As of 2009, this release has been discontinued and is out of print as BCI Eclipse has ceased operations.

In addition, a single episode, "The Plant Soldiers", was included as a bonus feature on the DVD release of the live-action The Secrets of Isis series.

References

External links
Freedom Force Entry at International Super Heroes

1970s American animated television series
1978 American television series debuts
1978 American television series endings
American children's animated superhero television series
American children's animated action television series
American children's animated adventure television series
American children's animated fantasy television series
CBS original programming
Superhero teams
Television series by Filmation
Television series by Warner Bros. Television Studios
Crossover animated television series